Kolomenskaya is an underground metro station on the Zamoskvoretskaya Line of the Moscow Metro in Moscow, Russia. It was named after the nearby Kolomenskoye museum-park. The station is situated at the intersection of Andropov avenue, Nagatinskaya and Sudostroitelnaya (literally Shipbuilding) streets

History
Kolomenskaya Station was opened on 11 August 1969 as a part of the southern line extension of the Moscow Metro system.

The stations has been closed since 12 November 2022 due to the reconstruction works.

Design
Octagonal pillars of the station hall are lined with grey marble and the floor is riveted with red granite in the centre and grey granite at the sides. The track walls are faced with yellow ceramic tiles with a stripe of grey marble at the base. The station is adorned with copper plaques on the theme How Motherland began (sculptor E.Ladygin).

Exits 
The station has two underground vestibules, located on the intersection between the Andropova avenue and the Nagatinskaya/Novinki street. Both vestibules are interlinked with underpasses that offer exits to the surface level which covered glazed pavilions.

Surrounding area 
The construction of the station is a typical example of Soviet urban development, as the apartment blocks that were built around it are contemporary with the station. The region that it is located in, Nagatino became part of Moscow only a few years prior to the construction of the station. Part of the track from Avtozavodskaya is above ground, and it passes over the Moskva River on the Nagatinsky Metro Bridge which was opened simultaneously with the new segment. Plans for a new station, Tekhnopark (alternative name, Prospekt Andropova) to be added in the future remains unfulfilled.

References

Moscow Metro stations
Railway stations in Russia opened in 1969
Zamoskvoretskaya Line
Railway stations located underground in Russia